This is a list of microscopists by alphabetical order of last name:

 Ernst Abbe
 Giovanni Battista Amici
 Henry Baker
 Wynne Edwin Baxter
 Eric Betzig
 Gerd Binnig
 David Cockayne
 Christian Colliex
 Frank Crisp
 Christian Gottfried Ehrenberg
 Humberto Fernández Morán
 Clara Franzini-Armstrong
 Franz Josef Giessibl
 Johannes Groenland
 Pieter Harting
 Arthur Hill Hassall
 Stefan Hell
 Peter Hirsch
 Archibald Howie
 Sumio Iijima
 Zacharias Janssen
 Alfred Kahl
 Max Knoll
 August Köhler
 Ondrej Krivanek
 Antonie van Leeuwenhoek
 Laurence D. Marks
 Benjamin Martin
 Matthew Fontaine Maury
 William E. Moerner
 John Howard Mummery
 Peter Nellist
 Johan Sebastiaan Ploem
 John Thomas Quekett
 Edwin John Quekett
 John Randall
 Heinrich Rohrer
 Ernst Ruska
 Helmut Ruska
 Henry Clifton Sorby
 Jan Swammerdam
 Edward Hutchinson Synge
 Knut Urban
 M.J. Whelan
 Nestor J. Zaluzec
 Carl Zeiss
 Frits Zernike

See also 
 Microscopy

 
Microscopists